"Whoa" is the second single from the album The Naked Truth by rapper Lil' Kim which is produced by J.R. Rotem. "Whoa" never made it to the Billboard Hot 100 but did make the R&B/Hip-Hop Tracks chart, where it peaked at number 30. Originally sent to US radio on November 22, 2005, it was then re-released in February to coincide with the airing of her reality show, Lil' Kim: Countdown to Lockdown, for which it served as the theme song. It was released in the United Kingdom on May 15, 2006.

Before the album was released, some versions of the "Lighters Up" promo CD and vinyl listed the title of the song as "My Ni*#@s". Due to the lyrics in the second verse, Whoa is heard as a Junior M.A.F.I.A. diss.

Music video
The music video, directed by Kirk Fraserm, was shot in New York City in 2005. "Whoa" premiered on 106 & Park on February 16, 2006.

The video begins with Kim, her friend/ co-defendant Moe and Zab Judah riding in a car talking. Once the first verse starts, one scene features Kim in a museum with a drink while looking at artwork. In another scene Kim is seen dodging laser beams and hiding from security. By the second verse Kim has stolen a painting and is seen escaping. Meanwhile, police ask friends of Kim to leave. By the second chorus Kim is seen returning to the car from the start of the video. Shortly after the song fades into another song "Spell Check" which in one scene Kim is singing the song in front of her car, and in another scene she is seen being forced out of her car and the painting she stole is being returned. At the end the police throw kim in the back of a police truck in an orange suit. The song sharply ends and large text appears that says COMING HOME SOON.

The video for song "Stomp" by Maino, featuring Lil' Kim, starts off where the Whoa video finishes, with Maino breaking Kim out of the police truck.

Formats and track listings
UK Promo CD
"Whoa" (Amended Radio Edit) – 3:36
"Whoa" (Instrumental) – 4:13

US/European Promo CD
"Whoa" (Radio Version) – 4:15
"Whoa" (Video Version) – 4:15
"Whoa" (Explicit Version) – 4:14
"Whoa" (Instrumental) – 4:12

US Whoa/Spell Check Promo CD
"Whoa" (Radio Version) – 4:15
"Whoa" (Video Version) – 4:15
"Whoa" (Explicit Version) – 4:14
"Whoa" (Instrumental) – 4:12
"Spell Check" (Radio Version) – 3:37
"Spell Check" (Explicit Version) – 3:37
"Spell Check" (Instrumental) – 3:37

UK CD1
"Whoa" (Explicit Album Version) – 4:10
"Whoa" (Josh Harris Radio Edit) – 3:45

UK CD2
"Whoa" (Explicit Album Version) – 4:10
"Whoa" (Josh Harris Radio Edit) – 3:45
"Whoa" (Video)
"Whoa" (MyTone Ringtone)

DJ Exclusive Remixes Promo CD
"Whoa" (E Smoove Dub) – 8:15
"Whoa" (True Visionary Extended Club) – 4:36
"Whoa" (Pull Club Mix) – 6:28
"Whoa" (Album Version) – 4:17
"Whoa" (Instrumental) – 4:13
"Whoa" (Josh Harris Club Mix) – 6:13
"Whoa" (Hani Num Club) – 7:38

Credits and personnel
Recorded by Dan The Man
Written by K. Jones, J. Rotem, D. Miller, S. Monty. 
Produced by J. R. Rotem
Mixed by Glen Marchese

Charts

References

2006 singles
Lil' Kim songs
Song recordings produced by J. R. Rotem
2006 songs
Songs written by J. R. Rotem
Atlantic Records singles
Diss tracks
Songs written by Lil' Kim